Joseph Steadman (1878–1944) was an English footballer who played three games as a winger for Burslem Port Vale at the start of the 20th century.

Career
Steadman joined Burslem Port Vale in November 1899 and scored on his debut game in a 2–0 win at Burton Swifts on 24 November 1900. He was only to play two more Second Division games however, before being released from the Athletic Ground in the summer of 1901.

Career statistics
Source:

References

1878 births
1944 deaths
Sportspeople from Newcastle-under-Lyme
English footballers
Association football wingers
Port Vale F.C. players
English Football League players